Dana Beyer (born February 9, 1952) is an American transgender rights advocate and the executive director of Gender Rights Maryland, a civil rights and advocacy organization serving Maryland's transgender community. She is a transgender woman.

Biography
Beyer was born on February 9, 1952, in New York, New York. Beyer graduated from Cornell University in 1974 with a Bachelor of Arts degree and from University of Pennsylvania School of Medicine in 1978 as a Doctor of Medicine. In 2008, Beyer completed Harvard University's John F. Kennedy School of Government program for Senior Executives in State and Local Government as a David Bohnett Foundation LGBTQ Victory Institute Leadership Fellow.

She is executive director of Gender Rights Maryland. She used to be on the board of directors of Equality Maryland. In 2014, she sat on the board of directors for LGBT employment equality advocacy group Freedom to Work. She is on the board of the national Jewish LGBT organization Keshet.

She blogs about transgender topics at HuffPost.

She is a politician from Maryland who ran in the Democratic primary for state Senate District 18. She received 41.8% of the vote (4,890 votes) and lost the 2014 primary election to Senator Richard Madaleno, who was the incumbent.

She is Jewish, has two sons and lives in Chevy Chase, Maryland.

Personal life 
During her adolescence, she became an accidental participant in the LGBT civil rights movement known as Stonewall. That was an awakening event for her, and became the beginning of her "coming-out" process.

References

External links
 
 Two LGBT candidates will go head-to-head in Md. Senate race  by Michael Gold (January 30, 2014), The Baltimore Sun

1952 births
Living people
21st-century American women politicians
21st-century American politicians
Activists from New York City
American political activists
American women columnists
Candidates in the 2014 United States elections
Cornell University alumni
HuffPost writers and columnists
Jewish activists
LGBT people from Maryland
LGBT people from New York (state)
American LGBT rights activists
Maryland Democrats
People from Chevy Chase, Maryland
People from Montgomery County, Maryland
Perelman School of Medicine at the University of Pennsylvania alumni
Transgender Jews
LGBT physicians
Transgender politicians
Transgender women
Transgender rights activists
Women in Maryland politics